Fabián Andrés Saavedra Muñoz (born 27 January 1992) is a Chilean footballer who plays for the Segunda División Profesional de Chile side Lautaro de Buin as a striker.

Honours
Unión Española
 Primera División: 2013 Transición

External links
  (archive)
 

1992 births
Living people
People from Santiago
People from Santiago Province, Chile
People from Santiago Metropolitan Region
Footballers from Santiago
Chilean footballers
Association football forwards
Unión Española footballers
Cobresal footballers
Santiago Morning footballers
Lautaro de Buin footballers
Chilean Primera División players
Segunda División Profesional de Chile players
Primera B de Chile players